Alistair Cees Overeem (born 17 May 1980) is a Dutch professional heavyweight mixed martial artist and kickboxer, currently competing in the heavyweight division of Glory. He is a former Strikeforce Heavyweight Champion, Dream Heavyweight Champion, K-1 World Grand Prix Champion, and was the first fighter to hold world titles in MMA and K-1 kickboxing at the same time.

Biography
Overeem was born in Hounslow, England, to a Jamaican father and a Dutch mother, whose family tree connects him to King William III of the Netherlands. When he was six years old, his parents divorced and he moved with his mother and older brother to the Netherlands. As a child, Overeem started training martial arts with his older brother Valentijn in order to defend himself from bullying. He decided to pursue a competitive sports career by his brother's example, first in Judo and later Track and Field and Basketball. At the age of 15, he followed Valentijn into Chris Dolman's Martial Arts gym to become a professional fighter. Alistair initially did not like the sport, as he was routinely beaten by more experienced students, but he changed his mind when he met Bas Rutten and Joop Kasteel, after which he fully dedicated himself to training.

Mixed martial arts career

Early MMA career
After posting a 10–3 record in Fighting Network Rings, M-1, It's Showtime, and 2 Hot 2 Handle, Overeem debuted in the Pride Fighting Championships on 20 July 2002, defeating Yusuke Imamura by TKO in 44 seconds.

PRIDE FC
Overeem won two more fights in Pride before entering the 2003 Pride Middleweight Grand Prix at Pride Total Elimination 2003 and losing to future UFC Light heavyweight Champion Chuck Liddell in the quarterfinal match. Overeem rebounded to defeat Tomohiko Hashimoto at the Inoki Bom-Ba-Ye 2003 in 36 seconds. On 31 October 2004, Overeem fought Hiromitsu Kanehara, defeating him by TKO in the second round at Pride 28. Overeem lost his next fight against Brazilian Top Team fighter Antônio Rogério Nogueira.

In 2005, Overeem entered the Pride Middleweight Grand Prix at Pride Total Elimination 2005, in which he defeated UFC Light heavyweight Champion Vitor Belfort by submission in the opening round. Overeem moved on to fight Igor Vovchanchyn in the quarterfinals at Pride Critical Countdown 2005 and won via submission in less than two minutes. Overeem lost in the semifinals to the eventual champion Maurício Rua.

In February 2006, Overeem fought Russian Top Team favourite Sergei Kharitonov. Overeem won, dislocating Kharitonov's shoulder in the process. With his win over Kharitonov, Overeem secured a spot in the PRIDE 2006 Openweight Grand Prix at Pride Total Elimination Absolute. He fought Brazilian jiu-jitsu specialist Fabrício Werdum, and lost via kimura in the second round.

Debut in Strikeforce
On 9 June 2006, Overeem travelled to San Jose, California, to win a rematch with Vitor Belfort by decision at Strikeforce: Revenge.

Return to PRIDE
A month later Overeem returned to PRIDE for a highly anticipated rematch with Antônio Rogério Nogueira. Overeem entered the fight with a heavily taped neck. After controlling the first round and a half with his striking, Overeem was stumbled from a punch, and Nogueira followed with a flurry of strikes. Worried Overeem would be more severely injured, his corner threw in the towel.

At Pride Final Conflict Absolute, Overeem lost to Ricardo Arona. Overeem was on the receiving end of a leg kick that caused a non-serious injury to his nerves, causing him to lose feeling in his foot and leg. Unable to mount much offence or defend against Arona, Overeem tapped out to avoid further injury.

He then suffered another KO loss to Maurício Rua at Pride 33, but returned in June 2007 with a submission win over Michael Knaap at K-1 Grand Prix in Amsterdam (despite K-1 being a kickboxing promotion, the bout was fought under MMA rules).

On 17 September 2007, at the Hero's 10: Middleweight Tournament Final, Alistair faced Sergei Kharitonov again. Overeem showed solid movement as soon as the first round began, but he suffered a KO loss just before the end of the first round.

Return to Strikeforce/DREAM/Dynamite
On 16 November 2007, Overeem defeated Paul Buentello for the vacant Strikeforce Heavyweight Championship by submission due to knee strikes.
On 15 June 2008 Overeem won by KO in the first round against Lee Tae-Hyun at DREAM 4. On 21 July 2008, Overeem defeated K-1 World Grand Prix Champion Mark Hunt in the first round by submission at Dream 5: Lightweight Grand Prix 2008 Final Round.

His next fight was against Mirko Cro Cop at Dream 6 on 23 September 2008. The bout was stopped about halfway through the first round and declared a no-contest, after Overeem landed multiple knees to the groin of Cro Cop.

Overeem was rumoured to be making his first title defence against Brett Rogers on 6 June at Strikeforce: Lawler vs. Shields. However, a hand injury scuttled plans for the fight. According to Golden Glory manager Bas Boon, Overeem had suffered a hand infection following a nightclub brawl early May 2009. According to Boon, Alistair and his brother Valentijn – both heavyweights – had been involved in an altercation that left five security staff needing hospital treatment and nearly cost Alistair his hand.

Overeem was scheduled to make his first Strikeforce Heavyweight Championship defence in a rematch against Fabrício Werdum at Strikeforce: Carano vs. Cyborg, but had to pull out due to a hand injury, most likely caused from his nightclub brawl.

Alistair defeated Tony Sylvester at Golden Glory's 10-year anniversary celebration with a standing guillotine choke. He used the same choke only eight days later to submit James Thompson at Dream 12.

Overeem was set to face Andrei Arlovski at Dynamite!! 2009, but FEG instead opted to have him face Kazuyuki Fujita to keep with the DREAM vs. Sengoku theme. Overeem quickly overpowered his opponent and recorded a knockout with a knee to the head.

Overeem next faced Brett Rogers on 15 May 2010 at Strikeforce: Heavy Artillery to defend his Strikeforce Heavyweight Championship. He won the fight via TKO in the first round. In his post-fight interview, Overeem declared for another time that he wants to fight Fedor Emelianenko, claiming that Fedor's management can no longer ignore his presence. The majority of Alistair Overeem's pre-fight training camp took place at the newly opened Golden Glory Gym in Pattaya, Thailand, where "The Demolition Man" concentrated on the further improvement of his Muay Thai skills.

Overeem faced Todd Duffee on 31 December 2010 at Dynamite!! 2010. He defeated Duffee by way of knockout 19 seconds into the first round to win the interim DREAM Heavyweight Championship.

Strikeforce Heavyweight Grand Prix
In early 2011, Overeem was named as one of eight men that will take part of the Strikeforce Heavyweight Grand Prix, alongside Fabrício Werdum, Sergei Kharitonov, Brett Rogers, Josh Barnett, Andrei Arlovski, Antônio Silva and Fedor Emelianenko.

A rematch with Fabrício Werdum took place on 18 June 2011, at Strikeforce: Dallas as part of an eight-man heavyweight tournament. Overeem defeated Werdum by unanimous decision (30–27, 30–27, and 29–28).

Removal from GP/Strikeforce
On 17 July, it was announced that Overeem was removed from the promotion's 2011 Heavyweight Grand Prix. Overeem went on to state that he felt the September date was too soon for him to return, and that he needed time to rest and heal after his 18 June quarterfinal decision win over Fabrício Werdum. Overeem was swapped out for unbeaten up-and-comer Daniel Cormier. Subsequently, on 29 July, it was announced that Overeem had been released from the Strikeforce organization as Zuffa exercised their right to eliminate the one remaining fight on his contract. It was revealed that the reason behind Overeem's release from Strikeforce was not due to his unwillingness to participate in the Grand Prix semi-finals, but due to Golden Glory's policy requiring that the money fighters made through fights be paid through their management first.

This disagreement led not only to Overeem's release but also other Golden Glory stars under a Zuffa contract, including former Strikeforce Women's Bantamweight Champion Marloes Coenen, Norwegian UFC Heavyweight Jon Olav Einemo, and even brother Valentijn Overeem. Team Golden Glory leader Bas Boon stated he has since changed the policy, and that Alistair Overeem could come to the UFC under an exclusive deal if the right terms are offered, which he later received.

Ultimate Fighting Championship (2011–2021)
After much speculation, on 6 September 2011 it was announced that Overeem had signed a contract with the UFC, and that his first fight would be against former UFC Heavyweight Champion Brock Lesnar on 30 December 2011 at UFC 141.

The lead up to the fight was rife with controversy. In November 2011, both competitors were required by the NSAC to comply with out-of-competition drug testing. Lesnar delivered his sample screen on 21 November, while Overeem delivered his on 23 November. The screen, however, did not meet the standards of the commission. Overeem submitted a second test through his personal physician – which was also deemed unacceptable – before flying out of the country. Overeem was ultimately given a conditional license for the fight by the committee during a meeting held on 12 December 2011.

On 30 December 2011, at UFC 141, Overeem made his UFC debut in the main event against Brock Lesnar. Overeem hurt Lesnar multiple times early on with knees to the body, and went on to finish the fight with a kick to the liver and subsequent punches at 2:26 of the first round. The victory earned him a heavyweight title shot against champion Junior dos Santos.

Failed drug test
Overeem was scheduled to fight UFC Heavyweight Champion Junior dos Santos on 26 May 2012 at UFC 146. However, on 4 April 2012, Overeem was revealed to have failed his pre-fight drug test by the Nevada State Athletic Commission (NSAC). Overeem had a 14-to-1 testosterone-to-epitestosterone (T/E) ratio, over the allowed ratio rate of 6-to-1. On Friday 20 April 2012 UFC President Dana White confirmed that Overeem had been removed from his fight with dos Santos and replaced by Frank Mir.

One day prior to his meeting with the NSAC, Overeem released a prepared statement to the media in which he claims the positive result of the drug test came as a result of a doctor-prescribed "anti-inflammatory medication that was mixed with testosterone." Overeem's lawyer filed a continuation request for additional time to gather support for his recent claim, which was voted on by the NSAC on 24 April 2012. The request was denied and the NSAC voted unanimously to deny Overeem's application status for a period of nine months, dating back to 27 March, the day of his drug test. He was allowed to reapply after this time period in December 2012.

Return
Overeem returned to face Antônio Silva on 2 February 2013 at UFC 156. Leading up to the fight, Overeem was dismissive of Silva's skills, claiming he was better than his opponent in every aspect of MMA. Despite being a heavy betting favourite and having won rounds one and two, an overconfident Overeem lost to Silva by KO in the third round.

Overeem was expected to face former UFC Heavyweight Champion Junior dos Santos on 25 May 2013 at UFC 160. However, in early March, Overeem pulled out of the bout, citing an injury and was replaced by Mark Hunt.

For his third fight with the promotion, Overeem faced Travis Browne in the co-main event at UFC Fight Night 26 on 17 August 2013. Overeem was dominant early in the fight, attacking Browne with a flurry of knees and punches. Browne recovered and defeated Overeem via TKO with a front kick.

Overeem was scheduled to face Frank Mir on 16 November 2013 at UFC 167. However, the pairing was moved to 1 February 2014 at UFC 169. He defeated Mir by unanimous decision and called out Brock Lesnar in his post-fight interview.

Overeem injured his elbow and decided to take the time out to have surgery, expecting to return in September 2014. On 9 July, the UFC announced he would face Ben Rothwell on 5 September 2014 at UFC Fight Night 50. Rothwell defeated Overeem via TKO in the first round.

Overeem faced Stefan Struve at UFC on Fox 13 on 13 December 2014. He won the fight via KO in the first round.

Overeem next faced Roy Nelson on 14 March 2015 at UFC 185. He won the fight by unanimous decision.

A bout with Junior dos Santos was rescheduled for 19 December 2015 at UFC on Fox 17. He won the fight via TKO in the second round.

On 15 February 2016, Overeem announced that he had signed a new contract with the UFC.

Overeem faced Andrei Arlovski on 8 May 2016 at UFC Fight Night 87. He won the fight via TKO early in the second round. Subsequently, he earned his first Performance of the Night bonus.

Overeem faced Stipe Miocic for the UFC Heavyweight Championship on 10 September 2016 at UFC 203. Overeem dropped Miocic with a quick straight left punch before losing the fight via knockout in the first round. Both participants were awarded Fight of the Night honors.

Overeem faced Mark Hunt in a rematch on 4 March 2017 at UFC 209. He won the fight via knockout in the third round.

A third fight with Fabrício Werdum took place on 8 July 2017 at UFC 213. Overeem won the fight by majority decision.

Overeem faced Francis Ngannou on 2 December 2017 at UFC 218. He lost the fight via knockout in the first round.

Overeem faced Curtis Blaydes on 9 June 2018 at UFC 225. He lost the fight via TKO due to elbows in the third round.

Overeem faced promotional newcomer Sergei Pavlovich on 24 November 2018 at UFC Fight Night 141. He won the fight via TKO in the first round.

Overeem was expected to face Alexander Volkov on 20 April 2019 at UFC Fight Night 149. Volkov was forced to withdraw from the bout, and was replaced by Alexey Oleynik. After a few back-and-forth exchanges, Overeem won the fight via technical knockout in round one.

Overeem was expected to face Walt Harris on 7 December 2019 at UFC on ESPN 7. However, Harris pulled out on 1 November 2019 due to the ongoing search for his missing step-daughter, and he was replaced by Jairzinho Rozenstruik. He lost the fight via knockout in the last four seconds of the fifth round after being up on all three judges' scorecards (39–37, 39–37, and 40–36).

The bout with Walt Harris was rescheduled to take place on 11 April 2020 at UFC Fight Night: Overeem vs. Harris. Due to the COVID-19 pandemic, the event was eventually postponed. The fight was rescheduled to 16 May 2020 at UFC on ESPN: Overeem vs. Harris. Overeem was dropped and almost finished early in the first round, but went onto dominate the fight with ground and pound, eventually finishing Harris with a head kick and more ground and pound for a second round TKO win.

Overeem faced Augusto Sakai on 5 September 2020 in the main event of UFC Fight Night 176. He won the fight via technical knockout in the fifth round.

Overeem faced Alexander Volkov on 6 February 2021 at UFC Fight Night 184. He lost the fight via technical knockout in round two.

On 3 March 2021, it was announced that Overeem had been released from his UFC contract.

Kickboxing career
Overeem then moved on to K-1, having two K-1 fights in six years against Errol Parris and Glaube Feitosa. Overeem was knocked out in both bouts and stayed with MMA from then on. He did not fight in K-1 for four more years.

On 31 December 2008, Overeem faced Badr Hari, one of K-1's top contenders, under K-1 rules at Dynamite!! 2008. He defeated Hari by way of knockout in the first round.

K-1
On 28 March 2009 he faced Remy Bonjasky, the defending K-1 Champion, at the K-1 World GP 2009 in Yokohama. Overeem had success in the first and second rounds, but was knocked down by a right hook from Bonjasky in the third, who secured a unanimous decision win. All three judges scored the bout 30–28 in favour of Bonjasky.

On 26 September, at the K-1 World Grand Prix 2009 Final 16, having been selected by fan voting after his impressive performances against Remy Bonjasky and Badr Hari, Overeem shocked the kickboxing world by achieving a huge upset. He defeated K-1's longest-serving member, legendary three-time champion Peter Aerts, by unanimous decision.
At the K-1 World Grand Prix 2009 Final, Overeem knocked out the Kyokushin karate champion, Ewerton Teixeira, with a knee strike in the first round, but lost to Badr Hari via TKO in the semifinals.

At the K-1 World Grand Prix 2010 in Yokohama, Overeem defeated Dzevad Poturak via KO (right knee) in round one at 2:40. Overeem defeated Ben Edwards by TKO in the first round on 2 October 2010 at K-1 World Grand Prix 2010 Final 16, which qualified him for the 2010 K-1 World Grand Prix.

On 11 December, at the Ariake Coliseum, Overeem won the K-1 World Grand Prix 2010 Final. In the quarterfinals, he beat Tyrone Spong by unanimous decision (29–27, 29–28, and 29–27). In the semi-finals, he defeated Gokhan Saki by first-round TKO after breaking Saki's right arm with a left middle kick. Saki's arm was already injured as a result of his previous fight with Daniel Ghita. In the finals, he fought Peter Aerts for a second time. Overeem came out aggressively and finished Aerts in the first round.

Glory
Over a decade removed from his previous kickboxing bouts, news surfaced on 8 June 2021, that Overeem had signed a multi-fight contract with Glory.

Overeem was scheduled to challenge the reigning Glory Heavyweight champion Rico Verhoeven at Glory: Collision 3 on 23 October 2021. On 6 October 2021 it was announced that Overeem had to withdraw from the event due to an injury. He was replaced by former Glory heavyweight title challenger Jamal Ben Saddik.

Overeem faced Badr Hari on 8 October 2022 at  Glory: Collision 4. He won the fight via unanimous decision. On 21 November 2022, it was revealed that Overeem had tested positive for a banned substance. After a few months the B- Sample was also tested positive the decison was overturned to a No-Contest due to the use of Performance-enhancing Drugs.

Pro wrestling

Wrestling Entertainment Series 
Overeem was scheduled to headline the first Wrestling Entertainment Series (WES) event in England against WWE wrestler Braun Strowman.

Fighting style
Overeem is considered one of the most well-rounded heavyweights in the sport, though he is mainly known for his excellence and power in the striking field. A kickboxer of the Dutch school of Muay Thai decorated in K-1 world tournaments, Overeem favours kicks to the body and legs and knee strikes from the clinch, which have been described as "devastating." His most famous finishing technique used to be the left knee to the midsection, which he has utilised to end many fights, but he switched to the left body kick instead late in his career. He is also proficient with left overhands and hooks once his opponents are worn down. On the grappling field, Overeem is universally known for his usage of the guillotine choke, a simple technique he uses to great effect thanks to his strength and height. Overeem was labeled as "the best grappler in Europe" after submitting all his opponents in the ADCC 2005 tryouts through this move.

Personal life
Overeem has a daughter, born 17 October 2006. Overeem and his current fiancée have two daughters (born 27 February 2016 and August 2017)

Overeem's great-great-grandfather was enslaved on the island of Jamaica. He became a free man and bought a large tract of land on which he started a village, which has survived and prospered to this day. His Dutch mother is a descendant of King William III of the Netherlands through one of his many illegitimate children.

Overeem has a cameo appearance in the music video for LMFAO's hit single "Sexy and I Know It".

Legal issues
In 2009, Alistair and his brother were involved in an altercation at a Dutch dance club. Alistair started arguing with a bouncer when he found himself without coins to pay the toilet woman and was asked to leave by five other security workers. Valentijn intervened in his favor and was hit in the face with a flash light, which incited a brawl. The incident ended with five bouncers having to go urgently to the hospital and Alistair being forced to turn down a title fight due to a hand injury gained in the brawl.

On 1 January 2012, following his match with Brock Lesnar at UFC 141, Overeem shoved a woman in the face, "causing her to stagger back," at the Wynn Las Vegas at about 3 a.m., according to the Las Vegas Police Department. Not arrested but summoned to court, Overeem was charged with misdemeanor battery and faced a maximum of six months in the Clark County Detention Center and a fine up to $1,000. On 28 March 2012, Overeem was given a 90-day county jail sentence that would be suspended depending on the completion of 50 hours of community service and anger management.

Championships and accomplishments

Kickboxing
K-1
K-1 2009 World Grand Prix (Third place)
K-1 2010 World Grand Prix (Champion)

Mixed martial arts
Ultimate Fighting Championship
Performance of the Night (One time) 
Fight of the Night (One time) 
Strikeforce
Strikeforce Heavyweight Championship (One time; First; Last; Only)
One successful title defence
PRIDE Fighting Championships
2005 PRIDE Middleweight Grand Prix Semifinalist
DREAM
DREAM Heavyweight Championship (One time; First; Last; Only)
2 Hot 2 Handle
2H2H Light heavyweight Championship (One time)
2H2H Light heavyweight Tournament Winner
World MMA Awards
2010 International Fighter of the Year
2011 International Fighter of the Year
Sherdog
2010 All-Violence Second Team
2015 All-Violence Third Team
MMADNA.nl
2018 Dutch Fighter of the Year.

Submission grappling
ADCC Submission Wrestling World Championship
2005 ADCC European Trials -98.9 kg Winner

Records
Only fighter to simultaneously hold three championship belts (Strikeforce, K-1 and Dream)
One of only two fighters to win a world championship in MMA and K-1

Mixed martial arts record

|Loss
|align=center|47–19 (1)
|Alexander Volkov
|TKO (punches)
|UFC Fight Night: Overeem vs. Volkov
|
|align=center|2
|align=center|2:06
|Las Vegas, Nevada, United States
|
|-
|Win
|align=center|47–18 (1)
|Augusto Sakai
|TKO (elbows and punches)
|UFC Fight Night: Overeem vs. Sakai
|
|align=center|5
|align=center|0:26
|Las Vegas, Nevada, United States
|
|-
|Win
|align=center|46–18 (1)
|Walt Harris
|TKO (punches)
|UFC on ESPN: Overeem vs. Harris
|
|align=center|2
|align=center|3:00
|Jacksonville, Florida, United States
|
|-
|Loss
|align=center|45–18 (1)
|Jairzinho Rozenstruik
|KO (punch)
|UFC on ESPN: Overeem vs. Rozenstruik 
|
|align=center|5
|align=center|4:56
|Washington, D.C., United States
|   
|-
|Win
|align=center|45–17 (1)
|Alexey Oleynik
|TKO (punches)
|UFC Fight Night: Overeem vs. Oleinik 
|
|align=center|1
|align=center|4:45
|Saint Petersburg, Russia
|
|-
|Win
|align=center|44–17 (1)
|Sergei Pavlovich 
|TKO (punches)
|UFC Fight Night: Blaydes vs. Ngannou 2
|
|align=center|1
|align=center|4:21
|Beijing, China
| 
|- 
|Loss
|align=center|43–17 (1)
|Curtis Blaydes
|TKO (elbows)
|UFC 225
|
|align=center|3
|align=center|2:56
|Chicago, Illinois, United States
|
|-
|Loss
|align=center|43–16 (1)
|Francis Ngannou
|KO (punch)
|UFC 218
|
|align=center|1
|align=center|1:42
|Detroit, Michigan, United States
|
|-
|Win
|align=center|43–15 (1)
|Fabrício Werdum
|Decision (majority)
|UFC 213
|
|align=center|3
|align=center|5:00
|Las Vegas, Nevada, United States
|
|-
|Win
|align=center|42–15 (1)
|Mark Hunt
|KO (knee)
|UFC 209
|
|align=center|3
|align=center|1:44
|Las Vegas, Nevada, United States
|
|-
|Loss
|align=center|41–15 (1)
|Stipe Miocic
|KO (punches)
|UFC 203
|
|align=center|1
|align=center|4:27
|Cleveland, Ohio, United States
|
|-
|Win
|align=center|41–14 (1)
|Andrei Arlovski
|TKO (front kick and punches)
|UFC Fight Night: Overeem vs. Arlovski
|
|align=center|2
|align=center|1:12
|Rotterdam, Netherlands
|
|-
|Win
|align=center|40–14 (1)
|Junior dos Santos
|TKO (punches)
|UFC on Fox: dos Anjos vs. Cowboy 2
|
|align=center|2
|align=center|4:43
|Orlando, Florida, United States
|
|-
| Win
| align=center|39–14 (1)
| Roy Nelson
| Decision (unanimous)
| UFC 185
| 
| align=center| 3
| align=center| 5:00
| Dallas, Texas, United States
|
|-
| Win
| align=center| 38–14 (1)
| Stefan Struve
| KO (punches)
| UFC on Fox: dos Santos vs. Miocic
| 
| align=center| 1
| align=center| 4:13
| Phoenix, Arizona, United States
|
|-
| Loss
| align=center| 37–14 (1)
| Ben Rothwell
| TKO (punches)
| UFC Fight Night: Jacaré vs. Mousasi
| 
| align=center| 1
| align=center| 2:19
| Mashantucket, Connecticut, United States
| 
|-
| Win
| align=center| 37–13 (1)
| Frank Mir
| Decision (unanimous)
| UFC 169
| 
| align=center| 3
| align=center| 5:00
| Newark, New Jersey, United States
| 
|-
| Loss
| align=center| 36–13 (1)
| Travis Browne
| KO (front kick and punches)
| UFC Fight Night: Shogun vs. Sonnen
| 
| align=center| 1
| align=center| 4:08
| Boston, Massachusetts, United States
| 
|-
| Loss
| align=center| 36–12 (1)
| Antônio Silva
| KO (punches)
| UFC 156
| 
| align=center| 3
| align=center| 0:25
| Las Vegas, Nevada, United States
| 
|-
| Win
| align=center| 36–11 (1)
| Brock Lesnar
| TKO (kick to the body and punches)
| UFC 141
| 
| align=center| 1
| align=center| 2:26
| Las Vegas, Nevada, United States
| 
|-
| Win
| align=center| 35–11 (1)
| Fabrício Werdum
| Decision (unanimous)
| Strikeforce: Overeem vs. Werdum
| 
| align=center| 3
| align=center| 5:00
| Dallas, Texas, United States
| 
|-
| Win
| align=center| 34–11 (1)
| Todd Duffee
| KO (punches)
| Dynamite!! 2010
| 
| align=center| 1
| align=center| 0:19
| Saitama, Japan
| 
|-
| Win
| align=center| 33–11 (1)
| Brett Rogers
| TKO (punches)
| Strikeforce: Heavy Artillery
| 
| align=center| 1
| align=center| 3:40
| St. Louis, Missouri, United States
| 
|-
| Win
| align=center|32–11 (1)
| Kazuyuki Fujita
| KO (knee)
| Dynamite!! The Power of Courage 2009
| 
| align=center| 1
| align=center| 1:15
| Saitama, Japan
| 
|-
| Win
| align=center|31–11 (1)
| James Thompson
| Submission (guillotine choke)
| Dream 12
| 
| align=center| 1
| align=center| 0:33
| Osaka, Japan
| 
|-
| Win
| align=center| 30–11 (1)
| Tony Sylvester
| Submission (guillotine choke)
| Ultimate Glory 11: A Decade of Fights
| 
| align=center| 1
| align=center| 1:23
| Amsterdam, Netherlands
| 
|-
| Win
| align=center| 29–11 (1)
| Gary Goodridge
| Submission (kimura)
| Ultimate Glory 10: The Battle of Arnhem
| 
| align=center| 1
| align=center| 1:47
| Arnhem, Netherlands
| 
|-
| NC
| align=center| 28–11 (1)
| Mirko Cro Cop
| NC (knee to the groin)
| Dream 6: Middleweight Grand Prix 2008 Final Round
| 
| align=center| 1
| align=center| 6:09
| Saitama, Japan
| 
|-
| Win
| align=center| 28–11
| Mark Hunt
| Submission (keylock)
|  Dream 5: Lightweight Grand Prix 2008 Final Round
| 
| align=center| 1
| align=center| 1:11
| Osaka, Japan
| 
|-
| Win
| align=center| 27–11
| Tae Hyun Lee
| KO (punches)
| Dream 4: Middleweight Grand Prix 2008 Second Round
| 
| align=center| 1
| align=center| 0:36
| Yokohama, Japan
| 
|-
| Win
| align=center| 26–11
| Paul Buentello
| TKO (submission knees to the body)
| Strikeforce: Four Men Enter, One Man Survives
| 
| align=center| 2
| align=center| 3:42
| San Jose, California, United States
| 
|-
| Loss
| align=center| 25–11
| Sergei Kharitonov
| KO (punch)
| Hero's 10: Middleweight Tournament Final
| 
| align=center| 1
| align=center| 4:21
| Yokohama, Japan
| 
|-
| Win
| align=center| 25–10
| Michael Knaap
| Submission (Peruvian necktie)
| K-1 World Grand Prix 2007 in Amsterdam
| 
| align=center| 1
| align=center| 3:29
| Amsterdam, Netherlands
| 
|-
| Loss
| align=center| 24–10
| Maurício Rua
| KO (punches)
| Pride 33
| 
| align=center| 1
| align=center| 3:37
| Las Vegas, Nevada, United States
| 
|-
| Loss
| align=center| 24–9
| Ricardo Arona
| TKO (submission to punches)
| Pride Final Conflict Absolute
| 
| align=center| 1
| align=center| 4:28
| Saitama, Japan
| 
|-
| Loss
| align=center| 24–8
| Antônio Rogério Nogueira
| TKO (corner stoppage)
| Pride Critical Countdown Absolute
| 
| align=center| 2
| align=center| 2:13
| Saitama, Japan
| 
|-
| Win
| align=center| 24–7
| Vitor Belfort
| Decision (unanimous)
| Strikeforce: Revenge
| 
| align=center| 3
| align=center| 5:00
| San Jose, California, United States
| 
|-
| Loss
| align=center| 23–7
| Fabrício Werdum
| Submission (kimura)
| Pride Total Elimination Absolute
| 
| align=center| 2
| align=center| 3:43
| Osaka, Japan
| 
|-
| Win
| align=center| 23–6
| Nikolajus Cilkinas
| Submission (armbar)
| WCFC: No Guts, No Glory
| 
| align=center| 1
| align=center| 1:42
| Manchester, England
| 
|-
| Win
| align=center| 22–6
| Sergei Kharitonov
| TKO (knees)
| Pride 31
| 
| align=center| 1
| align=center| 5:13
| Saitama, Japan
| 
|-
| Loss
| align=center| 21–6
| Maurício Rua
| TKO (punches)
| Pride Final Conflict 2005
| 
| align=center| 1
| align=center| 6:42
| Saitama, Japan
| 
|-
| Win
| align=center| 21–5
| Igor Vovchanchyn
| Submission (guillotine choke)
| Pride Critical Countdown 2005
| 
| align=center| 1
| align=center| 1:20
| Saitama, Japan
| 
|-
| Win
| align=center| 20–5
| Vitor Belfort
| Submission (guillotine choke)
| Pride Total Elimination 2005
| 
| align=center| 1
| align=center| 9:36
| Osaka, Japan
| 
|-
| Loss
| align=center| 19–5
| Antônio Rogério Nogueira
| Decision (unanimous)
| Pride 29
| 
| align=center| 3
| align=center| 5:00
| Saitama, Japan
| 
|-
| Win
| align=center| 19–4
| Hiromitsu Kanehara
| TKO (doctor stoppage)
| Pride 28
| 
| align=center| 2
| align=center| 3:52
| Saitama, Japan
| 
|-
| Win
| align=center| 18–4
| Rodney Glunder
| Submission (guillotine choke)
| 2 Hot 2 Handle
| 
| align=center| 1
| align=center| N/A
| Rotterdam, Netherlands
| 
|-
| Win
| align=center| 17–4
| Tomohiko Hashimoto
| TKO (knees)
| Inoki Bom-Ba-Ye 2003
| 
| align=center| 1
| align=center| 0:36
| Kobe, Japan
| 
|-
| Loss
| align=center| 16–4
| Chuck Liddell
| KO (punches)
| Pride Total Elimination 2003
| 
| align=center| 1
| align=center| 3:09
| Saitama, Japan
| 
|-
| Win
| align=center| 16–3
| Mike Bencic
| TKO (submission to knee to the body and punches)
| Pride 26
| 
| align=center| 1
| align=center| 3:44
| Yokohama, Japan
| 
|-
| Win
| align=center| 15–3
| Aaron Brink
| Submission (guillotine choke)
| 2H2H 6: Simply the Best 6
| 
| align=center| 1
| align=center| 0:53
| Rotterdam, Netherlands
| 
|-
| Win
| align=center| 14–3
| Bazigit Atajev
| TKO (knee to the body)
| Pride 24
| 
| align=center| 2
| align=center| 4:59
| Fukuoka, Japan
| 
|-
| Win
| align=center| 13–3
| Dave Vader
| TKO (doctor stoppage)
| rowspan=2|2H2H 5: Simply the Best 5
| rowspan=2|
| align=center| 2
| align=center| N/A
| rowspan=2|Rotterdam, Netherlands
| 
|-
| Win
| align=center| 12–3
| Moise Rimbon
| Submission (guillotine choke)
| align=center| 1
| align=center| 1:03
| 
|-
| Win
| align=center| 11–3
| Yusuke Imamura
| TKO (knee and punches)
| Pride The Best Vol.2
| 
| align=center| 1
| align=center| 0:44
| Tokyo, Japan
| 
|-
| Win
| align=center| 10–3
| Vesa Vuori
| TKO (punches)
| 2 Hot 2 Handle: Germany
| 
| align=center| 1
| align=center| 2:15
| Krefeld, Germany
| 
|-
| Win
| align=center| 9–3
| Sergey Kaznovsky
| Submission (armbar)
| M-1 MFC: Russia vs. the World 3
| 
| align=center| 1
| align=center| 3:37
| Saint Petersburg, Russia
| 
|-
| Win
| align=center| 8–3
| Roman Zentsov
| Submission (keylock)
| 2H2H 4: Simply the Best 4
| 
| align=center| 1
| align=center| 1:26
| Rotterdam, Netherlands
| 
|-
| Win
| align=center| 7–3
| Stanislav Nuschik
| TKO (knees)
| 2H2H 2: Simply The Best
| 
| align=center| 1
| align=center| 0:53
| Rotterdam, Netherlands
| 
|-
| Win
| align=center| 6–3
| Vladimer Tchanturia
| Submission (rear-naked choke)
| Rings: King of Kings 2000 Final
| 
| align=center| 1
| align=center| 1:06
| Tokyo, Japan
| 
|-
| Win
| align=center| 5–3
| Peter Verschuren
| Submission (keylock)
| It's Showtime: Christmas Edition
| 
| align=center| 1
| align=center| 1:06
| Haarlem, Netherlands
| 
|-
| Loss
| align=center| 4–3
| Bobby Hoffman
| KO (punch)
| Rings: Millennium Combine 2
| 
| align=center| 1
| align=center| 9:39
| Tokyo, Japan
| 
|-
| Loss
| align=center| 4–2
| Yuriy Kochkine
| Decision (split)
| Rings Russia: Russia vs. The World
| 
| align=center| 2
| align=center| 5:00
| Yekaterinburg, Russia
| 
|-
| Win
| align=center| 4–1
| Yasuhito Namekawa
| Submission (armbar)
| Rings: Millennium Combine 1
| 
| align=center| 1
| align=center| 0:45
| Tokyo, Japan
| 
|-
| Win
| align=center| 3–1
| Can Sahinbas
| KO (knee)
| 2 Hot 2 Handle 1
| 
| align=center| 1
| align=center| 2:21
| Rotterdam, Netherlands
| 
|-
| Win
| align=center| 2–1
| Chris Watts
| KO (knee to the body)
| Rings Holland: There Can Only Be One Champion
| 
| align=center| 1
| align=center| 3:58
| Utrecht, Netherlands
| 
|-
| Loss
| align=center| 1–1
| Yuriy Kochkine
| Decision (majority)
| Rings: King of Kings 1999 Block A
| 
| align=center| 2
| align=center| 5:00
| Tokyo, Japan
| 
|-
| Win
| align=center| 1–0
| Ricardo Fyeet
| Submission (guillotine choke)
| It's Showtime: It's Showtime
| 
| align=center| 1
| align=center| 1:39
| Haarlem, Netherlands
| 
|-

Pay-per-view bouts

Kickboxing record

|- style="background:#c5d2ea;"
|2022-10-08 || NC ||align=left| Badr Hari || Glory: Collision 4 || Arnhem, Netherlands|| No Contest || 3 || 3:00 || 10–4–(1)
|-
! style=background:white colspan=9 |
|-
|- style="background:#cfc;"
|2010-12-11 || Win ||align=left| Peter Aerts ||K-1 World Grand Prix 2010 Final, Final ||Tokyo, Japan ||TKO (Punches) || 1 || 1:07 || 10–4
|-
! style=background:white colspan=9 |
|-  style="background:#cfc;"
|2010-12-11 || Win ||align=left|  Gokhan Saki ||K-1 World Grand Prix 2010 Final, Semi Finals ||Tokyo, Japan ||TKO (Arm injury) || 1 || 2:20 || 9–4
|-  style="background:#cfc;"
|2010-12-11 || Win ||align=left| Tyrone Spong ||K-1 World Grand Prix 2010 Final, Quarter Finals ||Tokyo, Japan ||Decision (Unanimous) || 3 || 3:00 || 8–4
|-  style="background:#cfc;"
|2010-10-02 || Win ||align=left| Ben Edwards ||K-1 World Grand Prix 2010 in Seoul Final 16 ||Seoul, South Korea ||KO (Right hook) || 1 || 2:08 || 7–4
|-
! style=background:white colspan=9 |
|-  style="background:#cfc;"
|2010-04-03 || Win ||align=left| Dževad Poturak ||K-1 World Grand Prix 2010 in Yokohama || Yokohama, Japan || KO (Right knee) || 1 || 2:40 || 6–4
|-  style="background:#fbb;"
|2009-12-05 || Loss ||align=left| Badr Hari ||K-1 World Grand Prix 2009 Final, Semi Finals || Yokohama, Japan ||TKO (2 Knockdowns Rule) || 1 || 2:14 || 5–4
|-  style="background:#cfc;"
|2009-12-05 ||Win ||align=left| Ewerton Teixeira ||K-1 World Grand Prix 2009 Final, Quarter Finals || Yokohama, Japan ||KO (Knees) || 1 || 1:06 || 5–3
|-  style="background:#cfc;"
|2009-09-26 ||Win ||align=left| Peter Aerts ||K-1 World Grand Prix 2009 Final 16 || Seoul, South Korea ||Decision (Unanimous) || 3 || 3:00 || 4–3
|-
! style=background:white colspan=9 |
|-  style="background:#fbb;"
|2009-03-28 ||Loss ||align=left| Remy Bonjasky ||K-1 World GP 2009 in Yokohama || Yokohama, Japan ||Decision (Unanimous) || 3 || 3:00 || 3–3
|-  style="background:#cfc;"
|2008-12-31 ||Win ||align=left| Badr Hari ||Dynamite!! 2008 ||Saitama, Japan ||KO (Left hook) || 1 ||2:07 || 3–2
|-  style="background:#cfc;"
|2007-05-20 ||Win ||align=left| Jürgen Dolch ||Ultimate Glory 3: Upside Down ||Amersfoort, Netherlands ||KO (Punch) || 1 || 2:02 || 2–2
|-  style="background:#fbb;"
|2004-05-30 ||Loss ||align=left| Glaube Feitosa ||Kyokushin vs K-1 2004 All Out Battle ||Tokyo, Japan ||KO (Punch) || 1 || 2:13 || 1–2
|-  style="background:#fbb;"
|2001-02-04 ||Loss ||align=left| Errol Parris ||K-1 Holland GP 2001 in Arnhem ||Arnhem, Netherlands ||TKO (Corner stoppage) || 3 || 1:22 || 1–1
|-  style="background:#cfc;"
|1999-03-14 ||Win ||align=left| Paul Hordijk ||Thaiboxing Event in Veenendaal ||Veenendaal, Netherlands ||Decision (Unanimous) || 3 || 2:00 || 1–0
|-
| colspan=9 | Legend:

See also
List of male mixed martial artists
List of male kickboxers

References

External links
Official website

Profile at Dream 
Profile at Pride

1980 births
Living people
Dutch male kickboxers
Heavyweight kickboxers 
Doping cases in mixed martial arts
Dutch male mixed martial artists
Dutch sportspeople in doping cases
Dutch practitioners of Brazilian jiu-jitsu
Light heavyweight mixed martial artists
Heavyweight mixed martial artists
Mixed martial artists utilizing Brazilian jiu-jitsu
Mixed martial artists utilizing kickboxing
Dream (mixed martial arts) champions
Strikeforce (mixed martial arts) champions
Dutch people of Jamaican descent
English people of Dutch descent
English people of Jamaican descent
English male mixed martial artists
English male kickboxers
English practitioners of Brazilian jiu-jitsu
Sportspeople from Amersfoort
People from Hounslow
Dutch expatriate sportspeople in the United States
English expatriates in the United States
Ultimate Fighting Championship male fighters